Parliamentary elections were held in the United Arab Republic (now Egypt) on 8 January 1969, with a second round in 13 constituencies on 13 January. At the time the country was a one-party state and all candidates had to be members of the Arab Socialist Union (ASU). Two candidates were elected from each of the 175 constituencies, with a second round of voting required if one or both of the candidates failed to win over 50% of the vote in the first round, or neither of the candidates with over 50% were classed as a worker or farmer (each constituency had to have at least one farmer or worker representing it).

The ASU organised "candidature conferences" in which it selected two candidates for each constituency, except in the Suez Canal Zone, where 12 members were declared elected under Article 16 of the National Assembly Basic Act, which stated that "in cases of extreme necessity, the President of the Republic is empowered to declare the 2 candidates elected by decree, without any elections being held". In addition to the 338 candidates nominated by the conferences, a further 470 candidates were nominated by ASU members. Of the 350 members elected, 323 were conference candidates and 27 member candidates. Voter turnout was 88.2%. Following the election, a further 10 members were appointed by the President.

Results

References

United Arab Republic parliamentary election
Parliamentary election
Elections in the United Arab Republic
One-party elections
United Arab Republic parliamentary election